
Gmina Zawoja is a rural gmina (administrative district) in Sucha County, Lesser Poland Voivodeship, in southern Poland, on the Slovak border. The gmina also contains the village of Skawica.

Neighbouring gminas
Gmina Zawoja is bordered by the gminas of Bystra-Sidzina, Jabłonka, Koszarawa, Lipnica Wielka, Maków Podhalański and Stryszawa. It also borders Slovakia.

References
Polish official population figures 2006

Zawoja
Sucha County